The Yamaha YZF-R7 is a super sport motorcycle based on the MT-07 platform. On May 18, 2021 Yamaha announced the motorcycle, sharing a name with the 1999 YZF-R7 race homologation bike. The 2022 motorcycle is a mid capacity powered by a 54.7 kW (73 hp) liquid cooled four-stroke inline two cylinder double overhead cam 689cc engine. It features forged aluminum pistons with direct plated cylinders integrated with the crankcase.

The R7's reliable crossplane engine's 270 degree crank provides an uneven firing sequence, which is designed to deliver a more characterful note and emphasize torquey acceleration and power delivery. The engine is updated in 2021 to be Euro 5 compliant providing peak output of 73.4 hp at 8,750 rpm and 67 Nm of torque at 6,500 rpm.

References 

Yamaha motorcycles